Bojnu-ye Olya (also Romanized as Bojnū-ye ‘Olyā; also known as Bojnū) is a village in Binalud Rural District, in the Central District of Nishapur County, Razavi Khorasan Province, Iran. At the 2006 census, its population was 456, in 108 families.

References 

Populated places in Nishapur County